Serra de Tabatinga Environmental Protection Area is a protected area in the states of Piauí e Bahia, Brazil.
It is in the Cerrado biome.

Location

It is administered by the Chico Mendes Institute for Biodiversity Conservation.
It is in the municipality of Barreiras  in the state of Piauí .

Conservation

The area is classed as IUCN protected area category V, protected landscape/seascape.
The purpose is to protect biological diversity, control human occupation and ensure the sustainable use of natural resources.
Specifically, the unit was created to protect the headwaters of the Parnaíba River to ensure water quality.

Notes

Sources

Environmental protection areas of Brazil
Protected areas of Tocantins